Alpha Diallo, better known by his stage name Black Mesrimes or Black M (born 27 December 1984), is a French rapper and singer-songwriter.

Albums

Studio albums

Live albums

EPs

Singles

As featured artist

Other charted songs

With Sexion d'Assaut

References 

Discographies of French artists
Hip hop discographies